Raymond Albert Wheeler (31 July 1885 – 9 February 1974) was a lieutenant general in the United States Army Corps of Engineers and an engineer of international recognition. He fought in both World Wars, at the Marne in World War I, where he earned a Silver Star, and in the South-East Asian Theatre of World War II, where he personally accepted the Japanese surrender in Singapore. During and after the war he held key roles in major engineering projects of the 20th century, to include construction of the Ledo Road, St. Lawrence Seaway, and Missouri Basin Program, the clearing of the Suez Canal during the Suez Crisis, and the construction of tens of thousands of miles of rail and highway through Iraq and Iran during the development of Allied supply lines from Europe to Russia during World War II.

Life and career

He was born to Stephen and Margaret (née Maple) Wheeler in Peoria, Illinois on 31 July 1885. He attended the United States Military Academy, graduating 5th in his class in 1911, subsequently participating in the construction of the Panama Canal and working on engineering projects in Mexico with Douglas MacArthur, who was then a captain in the Corps of Engineers.

He attended the United States Army War College from 1936 to 1937.

At the time the United States entered World War II, Wheeler was developing a transportation network in the Middle East to ship munitions to the Soviet Union, which involved the extensive rebuilding of the railroads and highways of Iraq and Iran. In autumn 1943, he was appointed to the South East Asia Command (SEAC) of the South-East Asian Theatre of World War II on the staff of Admiral Lord Louis Mountbatten, Supreme Allied Commander South East Asia, where he served as principal administrative officer and directed construction of the Ledo Road. From February 1944, he served as Deputy Supreme Allied Commander South East Asia, replacing General "Vinegar Joe" Stilwell, and was the United States' representative in August 1945 at the Japanese surrender in Singapore.

He served as Chief of Engineers for the United States Army Corps of Engineers from 4 October 1945 to 28 February 1949, managing major projects including the St. Lawrence Seaway and the Missouri Valley Development. Following his retirement from the Army in 1949, Wheeler joined the International Bank for Reconstruction and Development as an engineering consultant; among the projects he was consulted on was a 9,000-mile survey of Indus basin water resources. He commanded the United Nations Suez Canal Clearance Operations following the 1956 Suez Crisis.

Awards and honors

Military
Wheeler's military awards included the Silver Star, the Air Medal, an Army Distinguished Service Medal with three Oak Leaf Clusters and the Legion of Merit. 

He fought in France during World War I, for which he was awarded the Silver Star and a Distinguished Service Medal.

Government
In 1945 Wheeler received the honorary title Knight Commander of the Most Excellent Order of the British Empire (KBE, Military Division).

1947, he was honored as Knight Commander of the Most Eminent Order of the Indian Empire (KCIE) for his construction of the Ledo Road.

Professional societies
For his work in clearing the Suez Canal, the American Society of Mechanical Engineers awarded Wheeler the Hoover Medal in 1958. The award's citation described Wheeler as a man who:typifies all that is best in leadership, training, experienced judgment, character and warm friendship in both the military engineer and the civilian engineer. His accomplishments throughout his life are outstanding, have brought great credit to his chosen profession, and mark him an eminent engineer of national and international recognition. His significant contributions include the monumental task of clearing the Suez Canal.He was made a member of the American Institute of Mining, Metallurgical, and Petroleum Engineers, American Society of Mechanical Engineers, and the Institute of Electrical and Electronics Engineers (I.E.E.E.), vice president of the Society of American Military Engineers for 1949, and a member of the board of review of the British Columbia Hydro and Power Authority. He was also a member of the chairman advisory board of the Mekong River Survey Mission in Cambodia, Laos, Thailand, and Vietnam, from 1960-1969, and an honorary member of American International Assurance.

Death
Wheeler died on 9 February 1974 at the Walter Reed Army Medical Center in Washington, D.C. and was buried in Arlington National Cemetery.

Dates of rank

Source:

See also

China Burma India Theater of World War II
 Major General Albert Wedemeyer, Lieutenant General Daniel Sultan

References

External links
Generals of World War II

1885 births
1974 deaths
United States Army War College alumni
Military personnel from Illinois
United States Army Corps of Engineers personnel
United States Army generals
United States Military Academy alumni
Burials at Arlington National Cemetery
Recipients of the Silver Star
Recipients of the Distinguished Service Medal (US Army)
Recipients of the Legion of Merit
Honorary Knights Commander of the Order of the Indian Empire
Honorary Knights Commander of the Order of the British Empire
People from Peoria, Illinois
United States Army Corps of Engineers Chiefs of Engineers
United States Army generals of World War II